Events from the year 2005 in Romania.

Incumbents
President: Traian Băsescu
Prime Minister: Călin Popescu-Tăriceanu

Events 
28 April - The MTV Romania Music Awards 2005 ceremony is held at Sala Palatului. 
21 May -  Luminiţa Anghel & Sistem represent Romania in the Eurovision Song Contest in Ukraine, with the song "Let Me Try"; they finish third.
November - The People's Party is formed by Corneliu Ciontu.
4 June - The Civic Forum of the Romanians of Covasna, Harghita and Mureș is founded.
16 December - The Romanian Church United with Rome, Greek-Catholic, is elevated to the rank of a Major Archiepiscopal Church by Pope Benedict XVI.
December - President Traian Băsescu and United States Secretary of State Condoleezza Rice sign an agreement that will allow a U.S. military presence at several Romanian facilities primarily in the eastern part of the country.

Deaths

16 March - Sergiu Cunescu, politician, the leader of the Social Democratic Party of Romania (PSDR) (born 1923)
2 September - Alexandru Paleologu, essayist, literary critic, diplomat and politician (born 1919)

See also
 
2005 in Europe
Romania in the Eurovision Song Contest 2005

References

External links

 
Years of the 21st century in Romania
Romania
2000s in Romania
Romania